Tommy Chang may refer to:

Tommy Chang (martial artist), Korean-Canadian martial artist and actor
Tommy Chang (educator), former Superindent of Public Schools in Boston, Massachusetts